The 2012 Mini 7 Racing Club season will consist of twelve rounds over seven events including returns to Oulton Park and Castle Combe. Endaf Owens is the Mini Miglia defending champion  and Paul Spark the Mini Se7en defending champion.

2012 calendar

Scoring system

References

External links 
 Official website of the Mini 7 Racing Club

Mini 7